The Gregory executive council was 9th executive council of British Ceylon. The government was led by Governor William Henry Gregory.

Executive council members

See also
 Cabinet of Sri Lanka

Notes

References

1872 establishments in Ceylon
1877 disestablishments in Ceylon
Cabinets established in 1872
Cabinets disestablished in 1877
Ceylonese executive councils
Ministries of Queen Victoria